The Politburo Standing Committee  can refer to:

Politburo Standing Committee of the Communist Party of China
Politburo Standing Committee of the Workers' Party of Korea
Politburo Standing Committee of the Communist Party of Vietnam (1996-2001)